Maria Matray (born Maria Charlotte Stern; 14 July 1907 – 30 October 1993) was a German screenwriter and film actress. Matray became a star of late Weimar cinema.

Biography
Following the Nazi takeover in 1933, Matray, who was Jewish, went into exile – initially in France and Britain before moving to the United States. She developed a new career as a choreographer and writer. She later returned to Germany after the Second World War, where she died in 1993.

Maria Matray was born in Niederschönhausen. She was the daughter of engineer and later director of AEG Georg Stern and his wife Lisbeth (née Schmidt), who was the younger sister of artist Käthe Kollwitz. Matray's older sisters were actress Johanna Hofer and dancer Katta Sterna. Hofer's father was Jewish and her mother was Lutheran.

Selected filmography

Actress
 The Master of Nuremberg (1927)
 Linden Lady on the Rhine (1927)
 Inherited Passions (1929)
 The Son of the White Mountain (1930)
 Never Trust a Woman (1930)
 Retreat on the Rhine (1930)
 Elisabeth of Austria (1931)
 Road to Rio (1931)
 The Ringer (1932)
 Secret Agent (1932)
 Distorting at the Resort (1932)
 A Man with Heart (1933)

Screenwriter
 Murder in the Music Hall (dir. John English, 1946)
 Invitation Playhouse: Mind Over Murder: The Last Act (dir. William Asher, 1952, TV series episode)
 Der König mit dem Regenschirm (dir. , 1954, TV film) — based on an operetta by Ralph Benatzky
 Abschiedsvorstellung (dir. , 1955, TV film)
 My Father, the Actor (dir. Robert Siodmak, 1956)
 The Night of the Storm (dir. Falk Harnack, 1957) — based on a novel by Klaus Hellmer
  (dir. Erik Ode, 1958)
  (dir. Axel von Ambesser, 1959)
 The Night Before the Premiere (dir. Georg Jacoby, 1959)
  (dir.
 Waldhausstraße 20 (dir. , 1960, TV film)
 The Happy Years of the Thorwalds (dir. Wolfgang Staudte, 1962) — based on Time and the Conways by J. B. Priestley
 Das Kriminalmuseum (1963–1968, TV series, 4 episodes)
 : Der Fall Krantz (dir. Georg Tressler, 1964, TV series episode)
 Der Prozeß Carl von O. (dir. , 1964, TV film) — (docudrama about the Weltbühne-Prozess)
  (1964–1965, TV series, 3 episodes)
 Ein langer Tag (dir. Lothar Kompatzki, 1964, TV film)
 Der Fall Harry Domela (dir. Wolfgang Schleif, 1965, TV film) — (docudrama about Harry Domela)
 Klaus Fuchs: Geschichte eines Atomverrats (dir. , 1965, TV film) — (docudrama about Klaus Fuchs)
  (dir. Peter Beauvais, 1965, TV film) — (docudrama about Bernhard Lichtenberg)
 Oberst Wennerström (dir. Helmut Ashley, 1965, TV film) — (docudrama about Stig Wennerström)
 Der Mann, der sich Abel nannte (dir. , 1966, TV film) — (docudrama about Rudolf Abel)
 Standgericht (dir. Rolf Busch, 1966, TV film)
  (dir. August Everding, 1966, TV film) — (docudrama about the Wall Street Crash of 1929)
 Der Fall Lothar Malskat (dir. Günter Meincke, 1966, TV film) — (docudrama about Lothar Malskat)
 Das Millionending (dir. Helmut Ashley, 1966, TV film) — based on a story by 
 Der Panamaskandal (dir. Paul Verhoeven, 1967, TV film) — (docudrama about the Panama scandals)
 Affäre Dreyfus (dir. , 1968, TV film) — (docudrama about the Dreyfus affair)
 Der Senator (dir. , 1968, TV film) — (docudrama about Joseph McCarthy)
  (dir. Wolfgang Becker, 1969, TV film)
 Maximilian von Mexiko (dir. , 1970, TV film) — (docudrama about the Second French intervention in Mexico)
 Millionen nach Maß (dir. , 1970, TV film)
 Der Hitler/Ludendorff-Prozeß (dir. Paul Verhoeven, 1971, TV film) — (docudrama about the trial after the Beer Hall Putsch 1923)
 Manolescu – Die fast wahre Biographie eines Gauners (dir. Hans Quest, 1972, TV film) — (docudrama about )
 Doppelspiel in Paris (dir. Wolfgang Glück, 1972, TV film) — (docudrama about Mathilde Carré)
 Sonderdezernat K1 (1972–1975, TV series, 12 episodes)
 Agent aus der Retorte (dir. Wolfgang Glück, 1972, TV film) — (docudrama about Operation Mincemeat)
 : Reise nach Stockholm (dir. , 1974, TV series episode)
 Wie starb Dag Hammerskjöld? (dir. , 1975, TV film) — (docudrama about the 1961 Ndola United Nations DC-6 crash)
 Als wär's ein Stück von mir (dir. August Everding, 1976, TV film) — based on the autobiography of Carl Zuckmayer
  (dir. Wolfgang Glück, 1978, anthology film, TV film) — based on short stories by O. Henry, P. G. Wodehouse and W. Somerset Maugham
 The Old Fox: Der schöne Alex (dir. , 1978, TV series episode)
 Auf Schusters Rappen (dir. Manfred Seide, 1981, TV film)
 Sun, Wine and Hard Nuts (1981, TV series, 2 episodes)
 Ein Winter auf Mallorca (dir. , 1982, TV film)
 Gauner im Paradies (dir. Thomas Fantl, 1985, TV film)
 Im Schatten von Gestern (dir. , 1985, TV film) — screenplay with Nathaniel Gutman
 Wie das Leben so spielt (dir. Hermann Leitner, 1986, TV film)
 Jungbrunnen (dir. Dušan Rapoš, 1992, TV film)

References

Bibliography
 Weniger, Kay. 'Es wird im Leben dir mehr genommen als gegeben ...' Lexikon der aus Deutschland und Österreich emigrierten Filmschaffenden 1933 bis 1945: Eine Gesamtübersicht. ACABUS Verlag, 2011.

External links

1907 births
1993 deaths
German people of Jewish descent
Jewish emigrants from Nazi Germany to the United States
Mass media people from Berlin
German film actresses
German silent film actresses
German women screenwriters
German women choreographers
Actresses from Berlin
20th-century German actresses
Burials at Munich Waldfriedhof